Sahrawi or Saharawi (also transliterated into Spanish as  or French as ), is an Arabic term meaning 'from the Sahara', or more specifically the Western Sahara. It can also mean 'from the desert' in general.

Sahrawi may also refer to:

People
the Sahrawi people, a Hassaniya-speaking ethnic group in the Maghreb region of Africa
the Sahrawi Arab Democratic Republic, the state of the Sahrawi people
holders of Sahrawi passports (see Sahrawi nationality law)
Women in the Sahrawi Arab Democratic Republic
residents of Western Sahara, the Tekna Zone or the Sahrawi refugee camps
persons from the Sahara desert

Surname
 Abdelbaki Sahraoui (1910–1995), Algerian imam
 Cheb Sahraoui (born 1961), Algerian musician and rai singer
 Djamila Sahraoui (born 1950), Algerian filmmaker
 Samira Sahraoui, Algerian actress
 Nabil Sahraoui (1969–2004), Algerian militant
 Youcef Sahraoui, director of cinematographic photography in Algeria
 Marouane Sahraoui (born 1996), French-born Tunisian football player
 Mohammed Sahraoui (born 1978), Tunisian boxer
 Mourad Sahraoui (born 1983), Tunisian boxer
 Osame Sahraoui, (born 2001), Norwegian football player

Arabic-language surnames
Language and nationality disambiguation pages